Torre di Feudozzo is a frazione of Castel di Sangro, in the Province of L'Aquila, in the Abruzzo, region of Italy.

Frazioni of the Province of L'Aquila
Castel di Sangro